Cowlairs railway station served the Cowlairs area of Glasgow, Scotland, from 1858 to 1964 on the Edinburgh and Glasgow Railway.

History 
The station was first opened on 1 April 1858 by the Edinburgh and Glasgow Railway, although it first appeared in Bradshaw in July 1859. To the northwest was the signal box and to the west was Cowlairs Works. The platform was widened in 1908. The signal box was replaced by Cowlairs Panel Box in 1956. The station closed on 7 September 1964. The signal box has not survived but the place where the island platform was can still be recognised today.

References

External links 

Disused railway stations in Glasgow
Railway stations in Great Britain opened in 1858
Railway stations in Great Britain closed in 1964
Beeching closures in Scotland
Former North British Railway stations
1858 establishments in Scotland
1964 disestablishments in Scotland